The Parliament of Jura is the legislature of the canton of Jura, in Switzerland.  Jura, styled a 'Republic and Canton', has a unicameral legislature. The Parliament has 60 seats, with members elected every five years.

The last election, on 18 October 2020, saw the Christian Democratic Party retain its plurality (15 seats). The Socialist Party (13 seats) and classical liberal Liberal-Radicals (8 seats) remained the second-, and third-largest parties. The Greens became the fourth-largest party (7 seats), gaining 3 seats. The national conservative UDC won 7 seats and the Christian left Christian Social Party won 6 seats. The communist Socialist Combat / Swiss Party of Labour alliance and the Green Liberal Party (competing for the first time) won two each.

External links
  Parliament of Jura official website

Jura
Canton of Jura
Jura